Mika Kuusisto (born 13 December 1967 in Jurva) is a Finnish former cross-country skier who competed during the 1990s. He won a bronze medal in the 4 × 10 km relay at the 1992 Winter Olympics in Albertville and also had his best individual Winter Olympics finish with a 23rd in the 50 km event in those same games.

Kuusisto also won a bronze in the 4 × 10 km relay at the 1991 Nordic skiing World Championships. He also won his only individual race at a 1997 event in Finland.

Cross-country skiing results
All results are sourced from the International Ski Federation (FIS).

Olympic Games
 1 medal – (1 bronze)

World Championships
 1 medal – (1 bronze)

World Cup

Season standings

Team podiums

 1 victory – (1 ) 
 6 podiums – (6 ) 

Note:   Until the 1999 World Championships and the 1994 Olympics, World Championship and Olympic races were included in the World Cup scoring system.

References

External links 
 
 
 

1967 births
Living people
Finnish male cross-country skiers
Olympic medalists in cross-country skiing
FIS Nordic World Ski Championships medalists in cross-country skiing
Medalists at the 1992 Winter Olympics
Olympic bronze medalists for Finland
Olympic cross-country skiers of Finland
Cross-country skiers at the 1992 Winter Olympics
Sportspeople from South Ostrobothnia
20th-century Finnish people